Phlyctaina is a monotypic litter moth genus of the family Erebidae. Its only species, Phlyctaina irrigualis, is found in North America. Both the genus and species were first described by Heinrich Benno Möschler in 1890.

The MONA or Hodges number for Phlyctaina irrigualis is 8392.

References

Further reading

 
 
 

Herminiinae
Articles created by Qbugbot
Moths described in 1890
Monotypic moth genera